George Shire is a Zimbabwean who lives in London in the United Kingdom. He is a veteran of the war to liberate Rhodesia from white minority rule. He has written newspaper articles and participated in television and radio programs defending the actions of Robert Mugabe's government. 

He is a retired academic who previously taught at the University of London; the Central Saint Martin, University of the Arts ; and the Open University. He has serves on the editorial boards of a number of journals in the fields of politics and culture, such as SOUNDINGS; DarkMatter; and Ecclipses Journal of Creative Research .

External links 
Article in The Guardian
Article  on BBC website

References 

Decolonization
Zimbabwean academics
Zimbabwean emigrants to the United Kingdom
British political scientists
Living people
Year of birth missing (living people)
Academics of the Open University
Academics of the University of the Arts London